Skärgårdsdoktorn is a Swedish television series produced by SVT Drama. The series ran from 1997 to 2000 and a total of 18 episodes were produced. In English, the title could be translated as The archipelago doctor, and it came to be one of the most popular Swedish TV series of the 1990s. With an average viewership of approximately 2.5 million it is considered one of the greatest successes of SVT Drama. Created by Lars Bill Lundholm and Gunilla Linn Persson, the first 8 episodes were directed by Martin Asphaug. The series was also broadcast in Norway, Finland and Denmark.

In May 2009, plans to produce a cinema feature film of Skärgårdsdoktorn were announced. Featuring the same characters ten years after, the estimated release date was Christmas 2010, or possibly January or February 2011. The film never materialized.

Plot 
The storyline follows a medical doctor, played by Samuel Fröler, who moves with his teenage daughter, played by Ebba Hultkvist, to Saltö, a small society on a fictional island in the Stockholm archipelago, and takes over his father-in-law's medical practice.

The plots deal with medical emergencies as well as relationship issues, and the daughter's longing for her mother who lives in Africa, having at the last moment chosen to stay behind to continue her work.

Cast

Main characters
Samuel Fröler as Dr. Johan Steen
Ebba Hultkvist as Wilma Steen
Sten Ljunggren as Dr. Axel Holtman
Helena Brodin as Sister Berit
Göran Engman as Sören Rapp
Marie Richardson as Eva Steen (1998–2000)

Recurring characters
Gunilla Röör as Helena Solberg
Anders Nyström as Captain Sandberg
Jacob Nordenson as Calle Trana
Tove Nordin as Madeleine "Maddo" Lindelius (1997–2000)
Katarina Ewerlöf as Maria Lindelius
Göran Forsmark as Thomas Terselius
Hanna Alström as Siri Terselius
Pontus Gustafson as George Lindelius
Raymond Nederström as Persson
Christer Flodin as Sture 
Ulla-Britt Norrman-Olsson as Stina Larsson
Lena Carlsson as Katarina Sjöblom
David Wiik as Benke Persson
Freja Lindström as Sara
Linda Lundmark as Karin
Henrik Linnros as Henrik Lundgren
Lennart Jähkel as Olle Nyholm

References

External links

Swedish television soap operas
1997 Swedish television series debuts
2000 Swedish television series endings
1990s Swedish television series
2000s Swedish television series
Television series set on fictional islands
Swedish-language television shows